Arenivaga floridensis is a species of sand cockroaches of the subfamily Corydiinae, in the family Corydiidae. It is a fossorial insect endemic to the Florida sand ridge. Its natural habitats are scrubland and sandhill communities on ancient ridges in peninsular Florida.

Sources
 Lamb, T., Justice, T.C. & Justice, M. 2006. Distribution and Status of the Cockroach Arenivaga floridensis Caudell, a Florida Sand Ridge Endemic. Southeastern Naturalist 5: 587–598

Cockroaches
Insects of North America
Insects described in 1918